Mumbai Marines Football Club is an Indian professional football club based in Mumbai, Maharashtra. The club competes in MFA Super League of Mumbai Football League. The club was established in 2017. Mumbai Marines finished fourth in the  MFA First Division, and gained promotion to the MFA Super League.

History 
The club was founded in the year 2017 in Mumbai. Same year, the club got registered with the Mumbai Football Association and played their first official league, MFA Third Division. In the 5 years of existence, Mumbai Marines has gained three back to back promotions in Mumbai Football League. In 2018–19 season, club reached the Round of 16 of MFA Third Division and gained promotion to the MFA Second Division. In 2019–20 season, the club was crowned Runners-up of the MFA Second Division and were promoted to MFA First Division. Due to the pandemic, the league was not organized for 2020–21 season. In the 2021–22 season, the club were the semi-finalist and finished fourth in the MFA First Division, which resulted in gaining promotion to the MFA Super Division.

Crest 
The blue, represents, the Arabian Sea, that surrounds Mumbai, the anchor represents, the seven islands, ‘anchored’ in the heart of Mumbai, the gold represents, Mumbai, the city of gold and the logo and the name, also gives its tribute to the Indian Navy.

Honours

Domestic league 
 MFA First Division
 Semi-finalist (1): 2021-22
 MFA Second Division
 Runners-up (1): 2019-20

References 

Association football clubs established in 2017
Football in Maharashtra
Football clubs in Mumbai
2017 establishments in Maharashtra